Sir Harry Oakes, 1st Baronet (23 December 1874 – 7 July 1943) was a British gold mine owner, entrepreneur, investor and philanthropist. He earned his fortune in Canada and moved to the Bahamas in the 1930s for tax purposes. Though American by birth, he became a British citizen and was granted the hereditary title of baronet in 1939.

Oakes was murdered in 1943 under mysterious circumstances, and the subsequent trial ended with acquittal of the accused. No further legal proceedings have taken place on the matter, the cause of death and the details surrounding it have never been entirely determined, and the case has been the subject of several books and four films.

Biography

Early life

Oakes was born in Sangerville, Maine, one of five children of William Pitt Oakes and Edith Nancy Lewis. His father was a prosperous lawyer. Harry Oakes graduated from Foxcroft Academy and went on to Bowdoin College in 1896, and he spent two years at the Syracuse University Medical School. One of his sisters, Gertrude Oakes, died in the 1935 sinking of the ocean liner SS Mohawk off the New Jersey coast.

Mining career
In 1898, Oakes left medical school before graduation and made his way to Alaska, at the height of the Klondike Gold Rush, in hopes of making his fortune as a prospector. For 15 years, he sought gold around the world, from California to Australia.

Oakes arrived in Kirkland Lake in Northern Ontario, Canada, on 19 June 1911. On September 23, 1911, he registered the transfer of claim T-1663, purchased from George Minaker, and established Lake Shore Mine. Twenty years later, the gold mine was the most productive in the Western Hemisphere, and it ultimately proved to be the second-largest gold mine in the Americas. His lavish lifestyle included a 1928 Hispano-Suiza H6B luxury car.

Moves to Bahamas, is created baronet

Oakes became a British subject, and he lived in the Bahamas for tax reasons from 1935 until his death. He was invited to the British colony by Sir Harold Christie, a prominent Bahamian real estate developer and legislator, who became a close business associate and friend.

In 1939, Oakes was created a baronet by King George VI as a reward for his philanthropic endeavours in the Bahamas, Canada and Britain. He donated US$500,000 in two bequests to St George's Hospital in London, and he gave US$1 million to charities in the Bahamas. He became a member of the colony's House of Assembly.

Bahamian investments
Oakes soon proved to be a dynamic investor, entrepreneur and developer in the Bahamas. He had a major role in expanding the airport, Oakes Field, in the capital Nassau; bought the British Colonial Hilton Nassau; built a golf course and country club; and developed farming and new housing. All of this activity greatly stimulated the struggling economy, with only about 70,000 inhabitants in the early 1940s. This activity took place mainly on the principal island of New Providence; it was estimated that Oakes owned about one-third of that island by the early 1940s. Oakes had become the colony's wealthiest, most powerful, and most important resident by the early 1940s.

Personal life
On 30 June 1923, Oakes married Eunice Myrtle McIntyre in Sydney, Australia. They had met aboard a cruise ship, and she was approximately half his age when they married.

They eventually had five children:
Nancy Oakes (1925–2005), who in 1942 married Count Alfred de Marigny (1910–1998) at the age of 18. They separated in 1945 and divorced in 1949.  She later had a longstanding relationship with British actor Richard Greene (1918–1985), with whom she had a daughter.  In 1952, she married Baron Ernst Lyssardt von Hoyningen-Huene, with whom she had one son before their divorce in 1956.  Nancy's children are:
Patricia Luisa Oakes (born 1951-2012), who married Franklin D. Roosevelt Jr. (1914–1988) in 1977, with whom she had one son before divorcing in 1981. Patricia later married Robert Leigh-Wood in 1984, with whom she had a daughter. Patricia's children are:
John Alexander Roosevelt (born 1977)
Shirley Leigh-Wood Oakes (born 1985)
Baron Alexander V. "Sasha" Hoynengen-Huene (born 1955)
Sir Sydney Oakes, 2nd Baronet of Nassau (1927–1966), who died in a car accident aged 39.
Sir Christopher Oakes, 3rd Baronet of Nassau (born 1949)
Shirley Oakes (1929-1986), who was involved in a car accident in 1981 that left her in a coma.
William Pitt Oakes (1930–1958), who died of an overdose aged 28.
Harry Philip Oakes (born 1932)

Oakes became interested in golf and, in the late 1920s, hired top golf course architect Stanley Thompson to build a nine-hole course for him, the "Sir Harry Oakes Private Course" in Niagara Falls, Ontario. Completed in 1929, the course is now the Oak Hall Par 3 public course.

Murder
Oakes was murdered sometime after midnight on July 8, 1943. He was struck four times behind the left ear with a miner's hand pick, to disguise the wounds from a silver ice pick (Simpsons of the Strand), and was then burned all over his body using insecticide, with the flames being concentrated around the eyes. His body was then sprinkled with feathers from a mattress. When Oakes was discovered, the feathers were still being gently blown over his body by the bedroom fan.

Investigation and trial
The Bahamas’ governor, the Duke of Windsor (formerly King Edward VIII of the United Kingdom), who had become a close friend of Oakes during the previous three years, took charge of the investigation from the outset. The Duke first attempted to enforce press censorship, but this was unsuccessful, since the Bahamas Tribune newspaper broke the story to the world within a few hours. Oakes' vast wealth, fame and British title, combined with the ghastly nature of the crime, generated worldwide interest in the case. Etienne Dupuch, the colony's foremost newspaper publisher and a close friend of Oakes, ensured constant coverage of the case for the several months which followed. Dupuch had called the Oakes residence early on the morning after the crime, since he had previously arranged to visit, and spoke with Harold Christie, who had stayed there overnight; Christie reported the death to Dupuch.

The Duke believed that the local police lacked the expertise to investigate the crime, and since World War II was raging, making it difficult to bring detectives from Scotland Yard in London, which was what normally would have been done, the Duke turned to two American policemen he knew in the Miami force. The Bahamas was a British Crown Colony at the time, and there were British Security personnel stationed in wartime in New York City and Washington, D.C. who could potentially have traveled easily and quickly to Nassau for an investigation. Bringing in the Miami Captains Melchen and Barker (Melchen had earlier guarded the Duke in Miami) proved an unfortunate decision.

The two American detectives were, in theory, called upon to assist Bahamian law enforcement, but to the dismay of the local police, they completely took over the investigation. The two American policemen had forgotten their fingerprint kits in Miami, and in any case, the local Bahamas police force did have fingerprint kits available right in Nassau. By evening on the second day of the investigation, 36 hours after Oakes' body was discovered, they had arrested Oakes' son-in-law, Count Alfred de Marigny. De Marigny had eloped with and married Oakes' daughter Nancy in New York City (where she was studying), without her parents' knowledge, two days after her 18th birthday, in 1942. Once she had reached age 18, Nancy no longer needed her parents' permission to wed. De Marigny, 14 years older, had met Nancy at the Nassau Yacht Club, where he was a prominent competitive sailor. The two had been dating for a couple of years before their marriage, without her parents apparently fully realizing the seriousness of their relationship. De Marigny was thought to have been on bad terms with Oakes, due to de Marigny's playboy manners and lack of a meaningful career, the fact that he had been married twice before for short periods to wealthy women, and that he had not asked Oakes' permission to marry Nancy. Oakes and de Marigny had quarreled on several occasions, witnessed by other people.

When Nancy was informed of her father's death and her husband's arrest, she was in Miami on her way for the summer to study dance with Martha Graham at Bennington, Vermont. It was her great friend Merce Cunningham who gave her the bad news. She then traveled to Bar Harbor, Maine, the family's summer home, to join her mother, at her husband's request. But Nancy soon returned to Nassau and began to organize her husband's defence. She was convinced that de Marigny was innocent and stood by him when many others, including her family, believed him guilty. The young countess soon became a favourite with the press worldwide for her auburn hair, deep-set eyes, fine figure and mild resemblance to Katharine Hepburn. The murder managed to knock the war off the front pages temporarily. Nancy spent heavily to hire a leading American private investigator, Raymond Schindler, to dig deeply into the case, and a prominent British-trained Bahamian lawyer, Godfrey W. Higgs, to defend her husband. They eventually found serious flaws in the prosecution's case.

De Marigny was committed for trial, and a rope was ordered for his hanging. However, he was acquitted in a trial that lasted several weeks, after the detectives were suspected of fabricating evidence against him. The chief piece of evidence was a fingerprint of his, which Captain Barker claimed had been found on a Chinese screen in Oakes' bedroom where the body had been found. Later, it was discovered that the print had been lifted from the water glass that de Marigny had used during his questioning by the Miami Police captains, and that de Marigny was being framed.

Immediately after Oakes' funeral had been held in Bar Harbor, Maine (the family's summer home), Captain Barker, visiting by invitation, told Nancy and Lady Oakes that he had already positively identified de Marigny's fingerprints on the Chinese screen, justifying de Marigny's status as the main suspect. Very detailed and thorough cross-examination at the trial, several months later, by de Marigny's lawyer showed that Barker had not in fact positively identified the single fingerprint as belonging to de Marigny until several days later than he had originally claimed - after he had returned to Miami - and that Barker had taken several dozen other fingerprints from Oakes' bedroom, many of which were still unprocessed weeks later. An American fingerprint expert witness, testifying for the defence, called into question the professionalism of the techniques used by Captain Barker in the investigation. The expert testified that the de Marigny print very likely could not have come from the Chinese screen, since none of the background pattern design from the screen appeared on the de Marigny print photograph, although other photos of fingerprints lifted from the screen showed this pattern. De Marigny testified that he had not visited Westbourne, Oakes' home and the murder site, for two years before Oakes' death, because of ongoing conflict with Oakes. Several of de Marigny's dinner party guests from the fateful night testified at the trial, and strengthened de Marigny's alibi that he was hosting the party, and later drove several guests to their homes, late at night, with a witness in the car, near the time when the murder was committed. The approximate time of the murder had been determined by two Bahamian medical examiners. Significantly, the Duke of Windsor arranged to be away from the Bahamas while the murder trial was in progress so he was not available to be called as a witness.

Oakes' murderer has never been found, and there were no court proceedings in the case after de Marigny's acquittal. The case received worldwide press coverage at the time, with photos of the beautiful and charming Nancy in court. It has been the subject of continuous interest, including several books and films (see below). The first full-length book on the case -- The Murder of Sir Harry Oakes, was published by the Bahamas Tribune newspaper in 1959; the paper was edited at the time by Etienne Dupuch.

Aftermath
After the trial Nancy went with de Marigny to Cuba to stay with their old friend Ernest Hemingway. De Marigny was deported to Cuba after a recommendation by the murder trial's jury, because of his supposedly unsavoury character and frequent advances towards young girls in the Bahamas. De Marigny and Nancy separated in 1945, and divorced in 1949. He moved to Canada in 1945 and served for a time in the Canadian Army, but was later deported from Canada. He married his fourth wife, settled in Central America, and died in 1998. De Marigny was a tall, handsome man, a charming and bright conversationalist and an accomplished competitive sailor who won many regattas, and he later wrote two books.

Nancy had left Cuba by the late 1940s, and lived in Hollywood, California, where she had a long affair with 1950s English Hollywood film and British TV star Richard Greene. They had a daughter, Patricia Oakes. She remained close friends with Greene until his death in 1985. In 1952 she married Baron Ernst Lyssardt von Hoyningen-Huene (adopted cousin of the artist George Hoyningen-Huene, the only son of Baron Barthold Theodor Hermann (Theodorovitch) von Hoyningen-Huene, a German nobleman who had estates in Estonia that were confiscated by the Soviets during World War II and was the German ambassador to Portugal during World War II,). They had a son, Baron Alexander von Hoyningen-Huene. The marriage lasted until 1956. Nancy died in 2005 and was survived by her two children and two grandchildren.

Oakes' legacy
Oakes' former home in Kirkland Lake, Ontario, is now the Museum of Northern History, dedicated to his life and to the region's mining history. Kirkland Lake is where he made his fortune as a prospector. He was inducted into the Canadian Mining Hall of Fame.

The Oakes baronetcy of Nassau, was assumed by Oakes's son Sir Sydney Oakes (1927–1966). On his death, Sir Sydney's son Christopher (born 1949) inherited the title. A district in Nassau was named after Oakes, complete with a memorial. Foxcroft Academy, a private school in  Dover-Foxcroft, Maine, has its football field named after Harry Oakes.

Niagara Falls: Investments and philanthropy

Oakes Park
During the Great Depression, Oakes donated a  parcel of land in what is now the central area of Niagara Falls, Ontario. He funded a make-work project and supplied tools to build a park at the location. Crews worked for $1 per day, switching every five days to permit as much employment as possible.

Oakes Park was opened on August 31, 1931. It is a multi-use, municipally owned and operated recreational complex. The main facilities are a baseball stadium used by the Greater Niagara Baseball Association and other elite youth and senior baseball clubs, two smaller baseball fields for younger divisions, a soccer pitch, and athletics facilities including a 400-metre track. The main baseball diamond has outfield dimensions of 318-402-322 ft, and has a press box, electronic scoreboard, and clubhouses.

Oakes Garden Theatre
Designed as an amphitheatre, Oakes Garden Theatre was opened in September 1937. Oakes, a member of the Niagara Parks Commission, donated the land at the foot of Clifton Hill and Niagara Parkway to the commission in 1936. The landscape architecture was done by Howard and Lorrie Dunington-Grubb, the building's architect was William Lyon Somerville with sculptures by Florence Wyle, Frances Loring and Elizabeth Wyn Wood.

Oak Hall
Oakes bought property just above Dufferin Islands from the estate of Walter H. Shoellkopf, on July 15, 1924. He constructed a 37-room Tudor- style mansion (by Findlay and Foulis in 1929 and later gatehouse and stables in 1931), where he and his wife lived from 1928 to 1935, known as Oak Hall. Oakes moved to the Bahamas afterward, due to what he felt was excessive taxation by the Canadian government - the Bahamas were virtually tax-free. Oakes' son, Sir Sydney Oakes, later occupied the residence. Since 1982, Oak Hall has been the headquarters for the Niagara Parks Commission. A portion of the estate was sold off in the 1960s and is part of Marineland of Canada.

American philanthropy and business dealings

The Willows
In 1938 Oakes and his family purchased a summer home called "The Willows" in Bar Harbor, Maine, designed by the firm of Andrews, Jacques and Rantoul in 1913. Lady Eunice Oakes gave it to Bowdoin College in 1958 and operated it as the Oakes Center, a conference center, till the early 1970s when it was sold to brothers James and Sonny Cough. They developed the land and built an oceanfront hotel consisting of several buildings called the Atlantic Oakes. Much of the mansion was significantly altered and covered in vinyl siding. It is now called The Atlantic Oceanside Hotel.

Foxcroft Academy
Oakes graduated from Foxcroft Academy in Dover-Foxcroft, Maine, founded in 1823, three years after statehood, one of the very few public high school "academies" left in Maine. The present campus is on the former Oakes farm on outer Main Street on the way to Sangerville, his birthplace.

Real estate investment in Florida
After the disastrous Florida Hurricane of 1928 and the Great Depression, Oakes bought  of partially developed land in northern Palm Beach County, Florida, from Harry Seymour Kelsey, who lacked the finances to rebuild his shattered development. Oakes spent a great deal of money on development of this property, which was later bought by John D. MacArthur, who completed its development. It includes most of North Palm Beach, Lake Park, Palm Beach Gardens and Palm Beach Shores. Oakes' castle-like home in North Palm Beach became the clubhouse for the village country club.

Books and films about the Oakes case

References

Further reading
 The Life and Death of Sir Harry Oakes, by Geoffrey Bocca, New York, Doubleday, 1959.
 Who Killed Sir Harry Oakes?, by Marshall Houts, London, Robert Hale, 1976, .
 Who Killed Sir Harry Oakes? , by James Leasor London 1983, 2011. 
 King of Fools, by John Parker (author), (American edition), New York, St. Martin's Press, 1988.
 Blood and Fire, the Duke of Windsor and the Strange Murder of Sir Harry Oakes, by John Marquis, LMH Publishing, 2005
 The Duchess of Windsor: The Secret Life, 2nd edition, by Charles Higham, 2005.
 The real-life murder case behind Any Human Heart, by William Boyd, The Guardian, 13 November 2010.
 Murdered Midas: A Millionaire, His Gold Mine, and a Strange Death on an Island Paradise, by Charlotte Gray,  Toronto, HarperCollins, 2019

External links
 Harry Oakes Murder thegrapevine.ca (Canada)
 Images of Oakes Garden Theatre Niagara Falls Niagara Falls Public Library (Ont.)
Images of Oak Hall Niagara Falls Public Library (Ont.)
Atlantic Oakes By-the-Sea Hotel  Bar Harbor, Maine

1874 births
1943 deaths
Bowdoin College alumni
British people murdered abroad
British philanthropists
British mining businesspeople
Canadian philanthropists
Canadian prospectors
Knights Bachelor
People from Sangerville, Maine
People from Kirkland Lake
People murdered in the Bahamas
Syracuse University alumni
Unsolved murders in the Bahamas
Canadian people murdered abroad
Canadian emigrants to the Bahamas
British emigrants to the Bahamas
Canadian mining businesspeople
Members of the House of Assembly of the Bahamas
People from North Palm Beach, Florida
Naturalised citizens of the United Kingdom
Baronets in the Baronetage of the United Kingdom
Foxcroft Academy alumni
Deaths by stabbing
British emigrants to Canada